Procris repens is a species of flowering plant in the nettle family, Urticaceae, commonly known as the watermelon begonia or sisik naga, although the latter name may also refer various Pyrrosia species.

P. repens is an interesting specimen to demonstrate the metamorphosis of chloroplasts (outward of cell) to amyloplasts (inward of cell) if studied with a microscope.

Under its synonym Elatostema repens it has won the Royal Horticultural Society's Award of Garden Merit. E. repens var. pulchrum has also won the award. Procris repens is also commonly referred to as Pellionia repens, although this name is now regarded as a synonym of Procris repens.

Biology

Description 
P. repens is a small herbaceous creeper that can reach 15 cm in height and 60 cm in length. Its leaves have toothed edges and are usually 2.5 to 10 cm in length and 2 to 5 cm in width. Its distinctive leaves have a pattern that resembles watermelon rinds or the foliage of certain Begonia species and may fade to completely purple or brown with age.

Distribution 
P. repens is distributed over a wide area, from southern China in the north down to Indonesia in the south. It mainly grows in primary forests in tropical and subtropical climates.

Ecology 
P. repens is a food plant for various Hypolimnas caterpillars.

References 

Urticaceae
Taxa named by João de Loureiro